Pleins feux sur Stanislas is a French-German comedy thriller film from 1965. It was directed by Jean-Charles Dudrumet, written by Michel Cousin and Jean-Charles Dudrumet, starring Jean Marais. The film was known under the title Killer Spy (USA),  (Portugal),  (West Germany).

It was a sequel of L'honorable Stanislas, agent secret from 1963.

Cast 
 Jean Marais: Stanislas Dubois, the secret agent, writer
 Nadja Tiller: Bénédicte Rameau, literature critic
 André Luguet: the colonel of Sailly, the leader
 Bernadette Lafont: Rosine Lenoble, the fiancée of Vladimir
 Rudolf Forster: Rameau, the father of Bénédicte (under the name of "Rudolph Forster")
 Nicole Maurey: Claire, the chairwoman of the association
 Yvonne Clech: the hotel keeper
 Marcelle Arnold: Morin, secretary of Stanislas
 Jacques Morel: the tax inspector of Stanislas
 Bernard Lajarrige: Paul, the butler of Stanislas
 Edward Meeks: James, the English spy
 Billy Kearns: American spy
 Clément Harari: Soviet spy
 Henri Tisot: Agent 07 at the telephone
 Pierre Tchernia: the TV presenter
 Max Montavon: the barman of the dining car
 Edmond Tamiz: Nikita / Vladimir, the murdered brothers
 Charles Régnier: the man with the cat (uncredited)

References

External links 
 
 Pleins feux sur Stanislas (1965) at Films de France

1965 films
French spy comedy films
1960s French-language films
German comedy films
Films scored by Georges Delerue
Films directed by Jean-Charles Dudrumet
1960s spy comedy films
French black-and-white films
French sequel films
1965 comedy films
1960s French films
1960s German films